Zeaxanthinibacter aestuarii is a Gram-negative and strictly aerobic bacterium from the genus of Zeaxanthinibacter which has been isolated from estuary sediments from Korea.

References

Flavobacteria
Bacteria described in 2016